Yeh Desh  is a 1984 Indian Hindi-language political film, directed by T. Rama Rao and produced by P. Mallikharjuna Rao. It stars Jeetendra, Kamal Haasan and Zeenat Aman with music composed by R. D. Burman. The film is a remake of the 1982 Malayalam film Ee Nadu.

Plot 
Chandra Mohan Azad is a trade union leader who dedicated his life to the welfare of laborers and their communal rights. As a result, he fights hostility from politicians and capitalists. A disgruntled group of people conspire against him, backhanding his associate Dharmdas and brother-in-law Deshbandhu, alleging Azad committed a crime. He receives a 7-year prison sentence. After his release, Azad learns that Deshbandhu became an MLA and Dharmdas became a millionaire. Azad seeks to kill Dharmdas but refrains after Dharmdas' wife, Sumathi, pleads with him not to do so. He then heads off to his village where people welcome him. Azad retorts against the idler politicians and toiles to rebuild his village.

Shashi & Radha are two local college students. Shashi gets into the clutches of Pratap, the younger brother of Dharmdas, who causes uproar and riots in the college. Salim, a worker, refuses a fine job abroad and accompanies Azad. Inspector Mathur is a sincere police officer and counteracts transgressions, but he is suppressed. At one point, Pratap teases Radha before she smacks him and, as payback, he tries to assault her; she later commits suicide. Inspector Mathur apprehends him, but his position helps him escape.

Meanwhile, Deshbandhu and Dharmdas collude to sell an illegal poisonous alcoholic drink. Multiple people die as a result. Inspector Mathur collects all the pieces of evidence; however, being dissatisfied with the results of the investigation, he quits his job. The incident ignites mayhem. After multiple events, Dharmdas kills Azad, with Sumathi witnessing the crime; she later presents evidence against him. The public then revolts under the leadership of Salim and they overthrow Deshbandhu. The movie ends with people giving tribute to Azad.

Cast 
 Jeetendra as Chandra Mohan Azaad
 Zeenat Aman as Sumathi
 Kamal Haasan as Inspector Mathur
 Vinod Mehra as Salim
 Sachin Pilgaonkar as Shashi
 Amrish Puri as Dhuliya
 Shakti Kapoor as Dharmdas
 Gulshan Grover as Pratap
 Utpal Dutt as Deshbandhu
 Om Shivpuri as Inspector Jagjit Singh
 Satyen Kappu as Rehman
 Aruna Irani as Dancer
 Seema Deo as Azad's sister
 Geetha as Pani
 Chandrashekhar as Chief Minister
 Pinchoo Kapoor as Sinha
 Dinesh Hingoo as Reporter
 Yunus Parvez as Bade Babu
 Bhagwan as Harold

Soundtrack 
The film's music was composed by R. D. Burman and the lyrics were written by Anand Bakshi. The soundtrack also contains the debut song of Kumar Sanu.

References

External links 
 

1984 films
1980s Hindi-language films
Hindi remakes of Telugu films
Films directed by T. Rama Rao
Films scored by R. D. Burman